The 1962–63 Tercera División season was the 27th since its establishment.

League tables

Group I

Group II

Group III

Group IV

Group V

Group VI

Group VII

Group VIII

Group IX

Group X

Group XI

Group XII

Group XIII

Group XIV

Promotion playoff

Champions

First round

Final round

Runners-up

First round

Second round

Final round

Season records
 Most wins: 25, Racing de Ferrol.
 Most draws: 13, Rayo Vallecano.
 Most losses: 25, Lieres, Artiguense, L'Alcúdia and Alhaurino.
 Most goals for: 93, Numancia.
 Most goals against: 109, Artiguense.
 Most points: 53, Racing de Ferrol.
 Fewest wins: 0, Alhaurino.
 Fewest draws: 1, 5 teams.
 Fewest losses: 2, Racing de Ferrol, Numancia and Maó.
 Fewest goals for: 16, Alaior and Juventud Sallista.
 Fewest goals against: 11, Maó.
 Fewest points: 3, Alhaurino.

Notes

External links
RSSSF 
Futbolme 

Tercera División seasons
3
Spain